The Viper Jaws pistol is a heavy duty single- and double-action pistol made in Jordan by KADDB and designed in the United States by the American citizen Wildey Moore, designer of the famous Wildey pistol. Apparently this pistol is the standard issue pistol for the Jordanian armed forces, hence another designation—JAWS, or Jordan Arms & Weapons System.

Design details 
The Viper JAWS is a solid and well made pistol with several interesting features, such as simple and robust design and modular construction. VIPER pistol can be easily reconfigured for several pistol calibers simply by replacing the barrel, breech face insert, the extractor and the magazine. This reconfiguration, as well as a standard field-stripping procedure, requires no tools. Grip panels also can be easily replaced with another unit with different shape or dimensions. Viper is a short recoil operated, locked breech pistol with rotating barrel. On recoil, barrel rotates to unlock from the slide, by following the curved track on the frame. The double-action trigger with its linkage is easily accessible for maintenance and cleaning via removable side plate, inserted into the cut cat the right side of the frame from the top. The ambidextrous safety lever is located on both sides of the slide and also acts as a decocker when safety is engaged. Both front and rear sight are dovetailed into the slide and can be easily changed if required.

Users

External links 
 The Viper
 Modern Firearms

Pistols